Gollum is a character in British writer J. R. R. Tolkien's fictional universe of Middle-earth.

Gollum may also refer to:

Gollum (genus), a genus of ground shark
Gollum (software), the wiki system used by the GitHub web hosting system
Gollum galaxias, a species of freshwater fish in the genus Galaxias 
Ingerophrynus gollum or Gollum's Toad
Gollum browser, a web application designed for using Wikipedia
Gollum or Golin language, a language of Papua New Guinea
The Lord of the Rings: Gollum, an upcoming video game
The NATO reporting name for the Smerch/Shtil-1 naval SAM in the Buk missile family

See also
Golem (disambiguation)
Collum (disambiguation)